Coleophora paragallivora is a moth of the family Coleophoridae. It is found in the southern Ural Mountains in Russia.

Adults have been recorded from late May to the beginning of June.

Etymology
The specific name is derived from the Latin para (meaning equal, like) and gallivora, referring to the close affinity with Coleophora gallivora, especially in the structure of the male genitalia.

References

paragallivora
Moths described in 2007
Moths of Europe